Oleksiy Volodymyrovych Yakymenko (born 22 October 1974, in Odessa, in the Ukrainian SSR of the Soviet Union) is a Ukrainian football midfielder.

Career
He played for Krystal Kherson, Vorskla Poltava, Torpedo Zaporizhzhia, Tavriya Kherson, SC Mykolaiv, Gazovik-Gazprom Izhevsk, Levski Sofia, Kryvbas Kryvyi Rih, Frunzenets-Liha-99 Sumy, Stal Alchevsk, Zorya Luhansk and Ihroservice Simferopol.

Honours 
champion: 1990.
 Ukrainian Premier League bronze medalist: 1998/1999, 1999/2000
 Ukrainian First League bronze medalist: 2004/2005
 Bulgarian A Professional Football Group runner-up: 1998
 Ukrainian Cup finalist: 1999

External links 

 Profile on Levski Sofia Website

1974 births
Living people
Footballers from Odesa
Ukrainian footballers
Ukrainian expatriate footballers
Expatriate footballers in Russia
Expatriate footballers in Bulgaria
Ukrainian expatriate sportspeople in Russia
Ukrainian expatriate sportspeople in Bulgaria
FC Krystal Kherson players
FC Vorskla Poltava players
FC Torpedo Zaporizhzhia players
MFC Mykolaiv players
PFC Levski Sofia players
FC Kryvbas Kryvyi Rih players
FC Kryvbas-2 Kryvyi Rih players
FC Frunzenets-Liha-99 Sumy players
FC Stal Alchevsk players
FC Zorya Luhansk players
FC Ihroservice Simferopol players
First Professional Football League (Bulgaria) players
Ukrainian football managers
FC Krystal Kherson managers
Association football midfielders